Bô-bí-lo̍k (literally 'happiness without rice' in Taiwanese; English title: Let It Be; Chinese: 無米樂; Simplified Chinese: 无米乐; Pinyin: Wu Mi Le) is a documentary film produced in Taiwan in 2004.

Synopsis
This documentary records the lives of several old farmers (peasants) in Chheⁿ-liâu Village, Āu-piah (i.e., Houbi Township), Tainan County (now part of Tainan City).  It generated discussion and debate in the Taiwanese civil society about the impact on agriculture due to its membership in the World Trade Organization.

Reception
The documentary garnered a number of awards, including:
 2004 First Prize in “Taiwan International Documentary Festival”
 2004 “Audience’s Choice Award” in “South Taiwan Film and Video Festival”
 2004 “Excellent Documentary Film Award” of “Golden Grain Awards”

References

External links
 Yahoo Movies entry (Chinese)
 Douban entry (Chinese)

2004 films
2004 documentary films
Documentary films about agriculture
Documentary films about Taiwan
Documentary films about globalization
Tainan
Taiwanese documentary films
Taiwanese-language films